The Pennsylvania Navy (more formally known as the Pennsylvania State Navy or in modern terms the Pennsylvania Naval Militia) served as the naval force of Pennsylvania during the American Revolution and afterward, until the formation of the United States Navy.  The navy's vessels served almost exclusively on the Delaware River, and were active (in conjunction with ships of the Continental Navy) in first defending the approaches to the city of Philadelphia during the British campaign that successfully occupied the city in 1777, and then preventing (at least for a time) the Royal Navy from resupplying the occupying army.

The Naval Militia would also be reactivated in the late 19th to early 20th century.

As under 10 U.S. Code §7851 naval militias form part of the United States organized militia and therefore are considered as such, the Pennsylvania Navy may be in any point in the future reactivated through either the office of the Governor of Pennsylvania and/or by legislative action committed by the bicameral Pennsylvania General Assembly.

History
When the American Revolutionary War broke out in early 1775, the colony of Pennsylvania's Committee of Safety decided that the colony's capital and seat of the Second Continental Congress, Philadelphia, would need to be protected against the incursions of British naval vessels on the Delaware River.  On July 6, 1775 it authorized the purchase and outfitting of ships for that purpose.  Two days later it placed its first order for an armed galley.  By October thirteen such boats had been built at a cost of £550 each, and outfitted with a single cannon in the bow, and  Thomas Read was appointed commodore of the fleet.

The first six were launched by July 19, and another six had been launched by the end of August. Their names were: Bulldog, Burke, Camden, Congress, Dickinson, Effingham I, Experiment, Franklin, Hancock, Ranger and Warren.

Additionally, 10 fire rafts were built in late 1775 and early 1776 and placed under the command of Captain John Hazelwood; the Arnold and the Putnam were built as floating batteries and were manned by Pennsylvania State Marines.  In April 1776 the state acquired the Montgomery, which Read served as captain of until he received a Continental Navy commission in October 1776.

By the end of August 1776, the Pennsylvania State Navy consisted of 768 men manning 27 vessels, with 21 more smaller vessels on order. These were armed with a four-pounder gun in the bow and were classed as guard boats.

Administration and command
The navy fell under the broad control of the Committee of Safety, which established subcommittees to manage the navy's operations and acquisitions.  When the state established a new constitution, with a Supreme Executive Council as its executive, the navy's administration was assigned to the Council of Safety.  In March 1777 the council established a naval board, which had full responsibility for the fleet, with the exception of the issuance of officer commissions, which authority the council retained.

Overall naval command of the fleet was at times contentious.  Thomas Read served as its first commodore, but he was replaced on January 13, 1776 by Thomas Caldwell, who only served briefly, resigning due to poor health in March.  His replacement, Samuel Davidson, was promoted by the committee ahead of other captains, and almost caused a mutiny.   As a result, Davidson was first removed from fleet command, and then eventually dismissed from the navy.  Fleet command was then given to Thomas Seymour, but Captain Hazelwood objected to serving under the elderly Seymour.  When British operations began to threaten Philadelphia in September 1777, the council dismissed Seymour and gave overall fleet command to Hazelwood.

In September 1778, the state established an admiralty court to adjudicate maritime cases and deal with the distribution of prizes.  While no explicit legislation authorizing privateering appears to have been passed, the state did issue more than 400 letters of marque between 1776 and 1782.

Operations
The navy saw action on May 6, 1776, when they engaged the British ships Roebuck 44 and Liverpool 28. The British were forced to withdraw to Newcastle, Delaware.  The fleet was also active in keeping British troops away from the river's eastern shore when General George Washington retreated across New Jersey following the loss of New York City.  Hazelwood was instrumental in preventing German troops from quartering in Burlington, New Jersey, a town sympathetic to the Loyalist cause, by bombarding it when troops were spotted there.  This forced their commander, Carl von Donop, to quarter his troops much more widely, and may have contributed to Washington's successful battle at Trenton on December 26, 1776.

The Pennsylvania State Navy was responsible for defense of the Delaware river when Philadelphia was occupied by British General Sir William Howe, where the Royal Navy wanted to control the river to resupply Howe's army.  At first the combined Pennsylvania and Continental fleet was successful, repulsing one attempt by the British to pass the defenses of Forts Mercer and Mifflin on October 22 and 23, 1777 with the destruction of two British war ships, HMS Augusta and HMS Merlin, under the command of Admiral Francis Reynolds. The fleet also bombarded von Donop's forces as they attacked Fort Mercer, in the Battle of Red Bank, in which the Hessians suffered one of their worst defeats of the war.

In November, the two forts were taken by British land forces, and Commodore John Hazelwood's fleet was then forced to withdraw upriver.  Unfavorable winds slowed their progress, and four ships (Montgomery, Delaware, Arnold, and Putnam) were burned to prevent their capture.

In April 1778 most of the fleet was destroyed in advance of expected British operations against it.  However, news that the British were going to withdraw from Philadelphia led to its resurrection, and in July Captain Hazelwood reported that the brig Convention was ready for action.  Its existence as a significant force was limited by the arrival of a French fleet on the North American coast, and in August 1778 the state's assembly voted to sell off most of its remaining ships, keeping only the Convention and a few smaller ships.

The smaller ships proved inadequate protection for the trade ships of Pennsylvania's merchants.  In response to their petitions, the state authorized the construction of the General Greene in March 1779.  Under her captain, James Montgomery, she cruised between New York and the Chesapeake Bay, often in conjunction with Continental Navy ships or privateers, and sent a number of prizes to Philadelphia.  According to Montgomery, her crew was virtually unmanageable, and she was sold at the end of the 1779 sailing season.  Her unusually low sales price aroused suspicions of collusion in the process.

By 1782 the activities of the Royal Navy and Loyalist privateers again spurred Philadelphia's merchants to petition for better naval defenses.  This resulted in the commissioning of the Hyder Ally, which was outfitted by the merchants, and placed under the command of the Continental Navy's Joshua Barney.  After the successful capture of HMS General Monk, Barney took over her command, renaming her Washington.  After a trip to the West Indies, she was sold to the Continental Navy.  The Hyder Ally continued to patrol without significant success.  By February 1783, with peace appearing to near, most of the state's ships had been sold and its sailors dismissed.  On April 10, 1783 the Supreme Executive Council ordered the remaining armed vessels to be disposed of.

Later naval militia

In April 1889, the Pennsylvania Naval Militia was reconstituted as the Naval Force of Pennsylvania - one of many organized state naval militias which were the predecessors to the modern day Naval Reserve.

Citations and references
Citations

References
  This work contains summary information on each of the various state navies.

External links
Pennsylvania State Navy website

United States Navy in the 18th century
Military units and formations of the United States in the American Revolutionary War
Navy
State defense forces of the United States
Disbanded navies